The Department of Primary Industries and Regional Development (DPIRD) is a Western Australian government department responsible for regulating and advancing agricultural and food industries, fisheries and regional development within the state. It was formed by an amalgamation of the Department of Agriculture and Food, Department of Fisheries and Department of Regional Development in 2017.

The Minister for Agriculture and Food, the Minister for Regional Development and the Minister for Fisheries are responsible for the department.

In 2004 the department had operating costs of $215,000,000 approx with $120,000,000 provided directly by the state government.  The balance was from federal government grants, public operating activities and user charges and fees.

This department was also responsible for quarantine control on all plants, soil and animal products brought into the state.  The Agricultural Protection Board [needs updating] is also part of this and responsible for the eradication of pests in Western Australia; including the rainbow lorikeet (Trichoglossus moluccanus), skeleton weed (Chondrilla juncea), and Portuguese millipede (Ommatoiulus moreletii).

History
In 1894, Premier John Forrest, established the Bureau of Agriculture under the chairmanship of Charles Harper.  The members were A.R. Richardson, W. Paterson (the first manager of the Agricultural Bank), J.H.D. Amherst, F.H. Piesse and G.L. Throssell.  Initially, the bureau was not placed under the supervision of a minister.  This changed in April 1898 when the bureau became the Agricultural Advisory Board and a new Department of Agriculture was gazetted under the control of Throssell as Commissioner for Crown Lands.

Professor William Lowrie was appointed director in 1908.  He resigned in 1911.  Sir James Mitchell was at this time Minister for Agriculture and he expanded the senior position to three commissioners: George Lowe Sutton, as Commissioner for the Wheat Belt, James M.B. Connor as Commissioner for the South-West; and James P. Moody as Commissioner for the Fruit Industries.

Names
 Western Australian Bureau of Agriculture                1894 - 1898 
 Department of Agriculture                               1898 - 2006
 Department of Agriculture and Food (Western Australia)  2006 - 2017
 Department of Primary Industries and Regional Development 2017

Research stations
The department operates the following research stations throughout Western Australia:

Avondale Agricultural Research Station
Badgingarra Research Station
Esperance Downs Research Station
Gascoyne Research Station - Carnarvon
Katanning Research Station
Kununurra: Frank Wise Research Institute
Manjimup Research Station
Medina Research Station
Merredin Research Station
Mount Barker Research Station
Newdegate Research Station
Vasse Research Station
Wongan Hills Research Station

See also
Buy West, Eat Best

References

Further reading
 Articles about the first months of the Western Australian Bureau of Agriculture (predecessor of Department of Agriculture): bureau set up, list of members and tasks it should accomplish (January 1894); editorial on new bureau and its proposed functions (2 March 1894); report of meeting (21 March 1894); report of bureau's first 6 months (September 1894).  West Australian, 27 January 1894, p. 4; 2 March 1894, p. 4; 21 March 1894, p. 2; 19 September 1894, p. 5,
 Watt, Peter. Centenary, 1894-1994: Profiles of Progress: Department of Agriculture Perth, W.A.: The Dept., 1994

External links

Primary
Agriculture in Western Australia
Western Australia
Primary industry departments in Australia